The Business Inspector is an observational documentary television series which aired on British terrestrial television station, Channel 5 in 2010. It is a spin-off from the popular British programme The Hotel Inspector. In each episode, businesswoman, entrepreneur, self-made millionaire Hilary Devey visited and aimed to transform struggling small businesses. Each week, Hilary tackled two ailing companies.

Series 1 (2010)

External links
"The Business Inspector" at channel5.com
 

Business-related television series in the United Kingdom
Channel 5 (British TV channel) original programming
2010 British television series debuts
2010 British television series endings
Television series by All3Media
English-language television shows